Kentucky Route 2168 (KY 2168) is a  state highway in Boyle County, Kentucky. It is mainly used as a connector between U.S. Route 127 (US 127), KY 33, and KY 34. The first roundabout in Boyle County was built at the junction of KY 2168 with KY 33. The route features a multi-use path between KY 33 and KY 34 with future plans to expand the path all the way to US 127.

Major intersections

References 

2168
Transportation in Boyle County, Kentucky
Danville, Kentucky micropolitan area